Pokaka was a station on the North Island Main Trunk line, in the Ruapehu District of New Zealand. It served the small village of Pokaka and lay to the south of Makatote Viaduct, the late completion of which held up opening of the station.

Name 
Pokako was changed to Pokaka in 1922, to "correct spelling", though both names seem to be used, at least from 1905 to 1945.

History 

Surveying for the route between Hīhītahi and Piriaka began in 1894. Work on the station building began in November 1908. Pokaka was described as a tablet station from 1908 and a tablet porter was appointed in 1912. A loop could take 57 wagons, until closed on 13 September 1986, prior to electrification. There is now only a single line through the former station site.

The station closed to goods traffic in wagon lots on 21 August 1965 and to all traffic on 1 September 1971.

Timber 
Like the other stations along this part of NIMT, Pokaka had freight from several timber mills. Tiratu Sawmill Co applied for a private siding in 1920. Pokaka Timber Co still had a private siding in 1943, which  ran to the west of the railway, probably from about 1935 to 1957. To the east, to supply timber to the Frankton Junction Railway House Factory, a state forestry  tramway and sawmill opened in 1922, operated by NZR with F Class locos, based in a shed at the station. It closed in March 1927, or 1928. The tramway was sold to Pokaka Timber Co. in 1936, who used the Climax loco from Rangataua. The tramway was dismantled and sold in 1954, though the cab of the Climax loco remains near the station. In 1922 Manawatu-Oroua Electric Power Board and Manawatu CC took over cutting of manoao for poles, though larger trees were milled into sleepers. A tramway was laid in 1923. A tramway to the Mangaturuturu valley was still in use in 1938.

Viaducts 
Makatote and Manganui o te Ao viaducts are north of Pokaka and Mangaturuturu just south. They take the line over the Makatote, Manganui o te Ao and Mangaturuturu valleys, which descend steeply from Mount Ruapehu. All were designed by Peter Seton Hay and supervised by Resident Engineer, Frederick William Furkert. The concrete foundations and piers were built by the Public Works Department, but as PWD's  Mangaonoho workshop was at full capacity on the more southerly viaducts, their steelwork was built by Christchurch firm, J. & A. Anderson & Co, who also built Waiteti and Makotuku viaducts.

Both viaducts were made up of a central concrete pier, supporting Warren truss steel girders and built using timber scaffolding. Like most NIMT viaducts, they were strengthened between 1925 and 1932, in preparation for the heavier K Class locos.

Manganui o te Ao Viaduct 

The original viaduct was replaced in 1967, or 1964, by a slightly longer  reinforced and pre-stressed concrete viaduct.

Mangaturuturu Viaduct 
It is one of the few viaducts surviving from the construction era and was therefore listed in 2009. Repairs and replacements included the rail beams in 1958, 1987, 2005 and 2008, bolts in 1962 and repainting in 1979 and 2005. In 1971 the central pier was underpinned and vertically pre-stressed.

References

External links 

Photos –

 Last Spike Obelisk in 1913
 goods train crossing the Manganui-a-te-Ao Viaduct in 1913
 log being loaded by overhead gear onto F class locomotive 255 at Pokaka Bush ca 1928–1929
1947 aerial view of railway station
 3 December 1966 crash at Pokaka

Railway stations in New Zealand
Rail transport in Manawatū-Whanganui
Buildings and structures in Manawatū-Whanganui
Railway stations opened in 1908
Ruapehu District
Railway stations closed in 1971